The Macedonian Lake Police is a part of the border police of North Macedonia, operating in Ohrid and Prespa lake. The police has over 200 members and is mostly active in Ohrid.

See also
 Police of North Macedonia
 Lions (police unit)

References 

Ohrid
Law enforcement in North Macedonia
Military units and formations of North Macedonia
Border guards